Pelham Public Schools or the Pelham Public School District, formally the Pelham Union Free School District, is a school district headquartered in Pelham, New York. It serves Pelham, which includes Pelham Manor and the Village of Pelham. , the district had about 2,800 students. , the City of New York pays the district to educate students in a portion of the Bronx due to geographic separation.

History 
In around 2013 Peter Giarrizzo became the superintendent. He resigned in 2017 as he became the superintendent of the North Shore Central School District. Cheryl Champ replaced him.

In 2020 the district banned displaying Thin Blue Line flags.

Communities served 
 the City of New York pays the Pelham school district to provide educational services for a section of 35 houses in the Bronx located between Pelham and Pelham Bay Park and separated from the remainder of the borough; the city has done so since 1948 because the New York City Public Schools buses may not be insured if they leave the New York City limits, which they must do in order to reach this section of the Bronx, and because the bus trip would be very expensive.  In 1997, five elementary school students and one high school student living in that section of the Bronx attended Pelham schools; New York City paid $15,892.86 each year for the high school student and $8,650.08 each year per elementary student.

Schools 
Secondary schools:
 Pelham Memorial High School
 Pelham Middle School
Primary schools:
 Colonial Elementary School
 Hutchinson Elementary School
 Prospect Hill Elementary School
 Siwanoy Elementary School

References

External links
 Pelham Union Free School District
Pelham, New York
School districts in Westchester County, New York
Education in the Bronx